Ida Rodríguez Prampolini (24 September 1925 – 26 July 2017) was a Mexican academic, art historian and cultural preservationist, who was heavily involved in the creation of organizations and institutions to preserve the artistic traditions of Mexico. To that end, she founded two art schools, eleven museums, twelve municipal archives, and over fifty houses of culture. She published over 400 articles and critiques of Mexican art and was honored with numerous awards over the course of her career.

Early life
Ida Rodríguez Prampolini was born on 24 September 1925 in the port of Veracruz, in Veracruz state, Mexico to Ida Prampolini and Carlos Rodríguez Mendoza. Her mother was of Italian origin and was instrumental in founding the chapter of the Red Cross in Veracruz. Her father was a physician and served as the director of the regional hospital. After completing her secondary education, she moved to Mexico City and enrolled in the Faculty of Philosophy and Letters at the National Autonomous University of Mexico, graduating with an undergraduate degree in philosophy and letters. She continued her education at UNAM, earning a master's degree in history in 1947 and a doctorate in literature with an emphasis in history in 1948.

While she was there, she met Mathias Goeritz, who would become her husband. In 1950, she went to Montreal, Canada, studying art history at McGill University.

Career
Returning to Mexico, Rodríguez began teaching at UNAM in 1954. Between 1954 and 1957 she traveled in Italy studying at the University of Perugia, the University of Bologna, and at the San Luca School in Venice. She joined UNAM's Institute of Aesthetic Research in 1957 to further her own academic research, which focused on Contemporary and Modern art. In 1960, she returned to Europe on a study tour throughout France, Italy, Spain and Switzerland. In 1974, she became a member of the Mexican Academy of Arts and was elevated to a Level III researcher in the National System of Researchers in 1985. Retiring from UNAM in 1987, Rodríguez became a researcher emeritus for the university in 1988.

In addition to publishing over 400 articles and books on art history, Rodríguez collaborated on exhibitions of the Instituto Nacional de Bellas Artes y Literatura, producing catalogs for various exhibitions hosted between 1966 and 1995. She presented lectures at various conferences including Introducción al arte abstracto y Pintura del siglo XX en México (Introduction to Abstract Art and Painting from the 20th Century in Mexico) hosted by the Escuela Nacional de Pintura, Escultura y Grabado "La Esmeralda" in 1961; El expresionismo abstracto y las nuevas derivaciones del dadaísmo (Abstract Expressionism and New Derivations of Dadaism) in 1963, Dadá y el surrealismo (Dada and Surrealism) in 1977 and Los orígenes del expresionismo alemán (The Origins of German Expressionism) in 1981, held at the Museo de Arte Moderno; Las últimas corrientes del arte (The Last Currents of Art) in 1964 and La escultura moderna (Modern Sculpture) in 1969 for the Palacio de Bellas Artes; and Diego Rivera, maestro de historia (Diego Rivera, Master of History) in 1986 at the Centro Cultural El Nigromante , among others.

Rodríguez returned to Veracruz after her retirement and in 1987 founded the Veracruz Institute of Culture, with the aim of publishing and preserving the cultural heritage and folklore of Veracruz. Serving as its director until 1993, she oversaw he creation of two art schools, eleven museums, twelve municipal archives, and over fifty houses of culture. She was granted chair number 8 in the Mexican Academy of History in 1989. That same year, she earned an appointment from the Royal Spanish Academy of History as a corresponding member. She was admitted to the International Union of Academies in Brussels, Belgium in 1996. The Instituto Nacional de Bellas Artes y Literatura honored her with the Fine Arts gold medal in 2009 and the state legislature of Veracruz bestowed upon her the Adolfo Ruiz Cortines Medal that same year.

Death and legacy
Rodríguez died on 26 July 2017 in Veracruz. Memorials to her passing were hosted by IVEC and the National Institute of Fine Arts.

Selected works

References

Citations

Bibliography

1925 births
2017 deaths
People from Veracruz (city)
National Autonomous University of Mexico alumni
Academic staff of the National Autonomous University of Mexico
Mexican art historians
Mexican people of Italian descent